Ibrahim Larry Sumaila (born 2 November 1994) is a Ghanaian professional footballer who plays as a defender for Ghanaian Premier league side Accra Hearts of Oak.

Career

Early career 
Sumaila moved Greece, with the hope of signing a contract with a top team in Greece. After successfully going on trials with Greek Super League side POAK FC, he was on the verge of signing a professional contract with the club but unfortunately couldn't land a permanent deal albeit being with the club's youth ranks for 18 months due to a contractual disagreement between his agent and the officials of POAK. He also had a stint in Egypt.

Hearts of Oak 
In January 2019, Sumaila was signed by Ghana Premier League giants Accra Hearts of Oak on a free transfer, after training with the club for weeks. He signed a two-year deal with an option to extend it by another year based on his performance. He made his debut during the 2019 GFA Normalization Committee Special Competition on 25 May 2019, starting and playing the full 90 minutes in a 1–0 loss to Dreams FC. During the 2019–20 Ghana Premier League season. he played in 3 league matches before the league was cancelled due to the COVID-19 pandemic. He was named on the club's squad list for the 2020–21 Ghana Premier League season. On 4 January 2020, during match day 3, he was adjudged the man of the match in a 0–0 draw with Karela United.

Style of play 
Sumaila named Hearts of Oak legend Yaw Amankwah Mireku as his idol and revealed that although his style of play is not a reminiscence of his, he really adored him. He style of play was likened to Emmanuel Osei Kuffour due to the way he approaches his game: smooth, subtle and extremely stylish.

Honours 
Hearts of Oak

 Ghana Premier League: 2020–21
Ghanaian FA Cup: 2021

See also 

 Yaw Amankwah Mireku
 Emmanuel Osei Kuffour

References

External links 

 
PHOTOS: Accra Hearts of Oak SC Unveil New Signing Ibrahim Larry Sumaila

1994 births
Living people
Ghanaian footballers
Association football defenders
Accra Hearts of Oak S.C. players